is a Japanese writer of mystery, horror, science fiction and historical fiction. He is a member of the Mystery Writers of Japan.

Works in English translation
Crime Novel
 The Case of the Sharaku Murders (original title: Sharaku Satsujin Jiken), trans. Ian Macdonald (Thames River Press, 2013)

Short horror story
 Reunion (original title: Daisuki na Ane), trans. Andrew Cunningham (Kaiki: Uncanny Tales from Japan, Volume 2: Country Delights, Kurodahan Press, 2010)

Awards
 1983 – Edogawa Rampo Prize: The Case of the Sharaku Murders
 1986 – Yoshikawa Eiji Prize for New Writers: Sōmon-Dani (The Somon Valley)
 1987 – Mystery Writers of Japan Award for Best Novel: Hokusai Satsujin Jiken (The Case of the Hokusai Murders)
 1992 – Naoki Prize: Akai Kioku (The Scarlet Memories)
 2000 – Yoshikawa Eiji Prize for Literature: Kaen (Flaming Rancor)
 2011 – Japan Mystery Literature Award for Lifetime Achievement

Main works

Ukiyo-e murder trilogy
 , 1983 (The Case of the Sharaku Murders, Thames River Press, 2013)
 , 1986 (The Case of the Hokusai Murders)
 , 1989 (The Case of the Hiroshige Murders)

Detective Sotaro Toma series
Novels
 , 1988 (The Case of the Utamaro Forgery Erasures)
 , 1988
 , 1989 (Labyrinth of the Southern Court)
 , 1990
 , 2002 (The Case of the Gogh Murders)
Short story collection
 , 1990 (Hokusai's Sin)

Standalone novels
 , 1985 (London's Tower of Murder)
 , 1990 (Murder at the Puppet Museum)
 , 1985 (Sōmon Valley)

Memories series (horror novels)
 , 1991
 , 1996
 , 2000

See also

Japanese detective fiction

References

External links
 Profile at J'Lit Books from Japan 
 Synopsis of The Case of the Sharaku Murders at JLPP (Japanese Literature Publishing Project) 

1947 births
20th-century Japanese novelists
21st-century Japanese novelists
Japanese male short story writers
Japanese mystery writers
Japanese crime fiction writers
Japanese horror writers
Japanese science fiction writers
Edogawa Rampo Prize winners
Mystery Writers of Japan Award winners
Living people
People from Iwate Prefecture
20th-century Japanese short story writers
21st-century Japanese short story writers
20th-century Japanese male writers
21st-century male writers